The 2007–08 season was the 51st season in RK Zamet’s history. It is their 7th successive season in the Dukat 1.HRL, and 31st successive top tier season.

First team squad

Goalkeeper
 1  Damir Bobanović
 12  Igor Dokmanović
 16  Ivan Pešić

Wingers
RW
 6  Dario Černeka
 13  Josip Crnić
LW
 4  Mateo Hrvatin
 14  Marko Erstić 
 22  Damir Vučko 

Line players
 8  Krešimir Kozina
 11  Mirjan Horvat
 19  Marin Sakić

Back players
LB
 9  Ivan Ćosić
 10  Jakov Gojun
 17  Andrej Sekulić
 18  Nikola Kosanović
 20  Marko Vidović
 21  Frane Bukvić
CB
 2  Dalibor Prokopić
 5  Marijan Bašić
RB
 3  Marko Zelić
 7  Milan Uzelac (captain)
 15  Marin Kružić
 19  Luka Bracanovic
 20  Andrej Sekulić
 22  Luka Kovačević

Technical staff
  President: Zlatko Kolić
  Vice-president: Željko Jovanović 
  Sports director: Alvaro Načinović 
  Club secretary: Daniela Juriša
  Head Coach: Drago Žiljak 
  Assistant Coach: Marin Mišković
  Goalkeeper Coach: Igor Dokmanović
  Fitness Coach: Emil Baltić
  Fizioterapist: Branimir Maričević
  Tehniko: Williams Černeka

Competitions

Overall

Dukat 1.HRL

League table

Source: SportNet.hr

Matches

Source: Hrs.hr

Croatian Cup

Source: Hrs.hrSource: Sportnet.rtl.hr

Friendly matches

Transfers

In

Out

Sources
HRS
Sport.net.hr
Rk-zamet.hr
Rijeka.hr

References

RK Zamet seasons
Handball in Croatia